Chabrillan is a commune of the Drôme département in southeastern France.

Population

Sights and monuments
The French Ministry of Culture has designated two buildings as monuments historiques in Chabrillan:
 Château de Chabrillan, ruins of medieval castle.
 Eglise Saint-Pierre, the church.

See also
Communes of the Drôme department

References

External links

 
 

Communes of Drôme